Diphyrama singularis is a species of beetle in the family Cerambycidae, the only species in the genus Diphyrama.

References

Anaglyptini